01582 may refer to:
 The ZIP code for Westborough, Massachusetts, United States
 The dialling code for Luton, United Kingdom